Živorad Tomić (born 15 June 1951) is a Croatian film director, screenwriter and critic. Tomić was one of the most prominent Croatian film critics from the mid-1970s to the late 1990s.

Tomić was born in 1951 in Zagreb. He studied comparative literature and English studies at the Faculty of Humanities and Social Sciences, and film and television directing at the Academy of Dramatic Art in Zagreb. Since 1984, he was a member of the film editorial board at Radiotelevision Zagreb.

He is the recipient of the 2015 Vladimir Vuković Lifetime Achievement Award by the Croatian Film Critics' Society.


Works

Feature films
Kraljeva završnica (1987)
Diploma za smrt (1989)

Books

References

Further reading

External links

 Živorad Tomić at kinotuskanac.hr 
Filmski vremeplov: Samozatajni autor i dva žanrovska bisera s kraja 80-ih (Ž. Tomić) 
Nezamjenjiva tvornica snova 

1951 births
Croatian film directors
Croatian screenwriters
Croatian film critics
Film people from Zagreb
Living people